Irakalgada also spelled as Irkalgada is a village near Bewoor in the Koppal taluk of Koppal district in the Indian state of Karnataka.  Irakalgada is located north to District Headquarters Koppal. Irakalgada lies on Karnataka State highway 36 connecting Koppal-Kushtagi.  Irakalgada is 12 km from 
Koppal.

Irakalgada Fort
Irakalgada Fort is one of the attractions in Irakalgada.

Demographics
As of 2001 India census, Irakalagad had a population of 4,762 with 1,736 males and 1,670 females and 631 Households.

See also 
 Gangavathi
 Kukanapalli
 Kushtagi
 Bewoor
 Koppal

References

External links 
 www.koppal.nic.in

Villages in Koppal district